The Schreder HP-20 is an American, high-wing, T-tail, single seat glider designed by Richard Schreder.

Design and development
The HP-20 was designed by Schreder for the FAI 15 Metre Class. The HP-20 prototype was just complete when Schreder lost interest in the project and moved on to work on the HP-21 instead. The sole example of the HP-20 was built by Schreder in his workshop in Byran, Ohio and first flew in 1981.

The HP-20 is all-metal with foam wing ribs. The design shares a similar fuselage to the HP-19, but has a different double-tapered wing of smaller area,  versus  for the HP-19. This gives the HP-20 a higher wing loading and higher best glide speed, although the glide ratio is the same as the HP-19 at 42:1. The airfoil is a Schreder modification of a Wortmann section, designated as Schreder 3.  of water ballast can be carried. The landing gear is a retractable monowheel.

Operational history
Even though Richard Schreder died in August 2002, in April 2011 the sole HP-20 was still registered to him.

Specifications (HP-20)

See also

References

1980s United States sailplanes
Schreder aircraft
Aircraft first flown in 1981